Rashmi Nigam is an Indian model and actress. She made her acting debut with the short Ja Re Ja in 2001. After that in 2004, she made her Bollywood debut in the film Popcorn Khao! Mast Ho Jao. In 2012 she acted in Madhur Bhandarkar’s drama film Heroine.

Filmography

References

External links

 
 
 
 

Year of birth missing (living people)
Living people
Indian female models
Indian actresses